<noinclude>

Morelos is a state in South Central Mexico that is currently divided into 36 municipalities. According to the 2020 Mexican Census, it is the twenty-third most populated state with  inhabitants and the third smallest by land area spanning .

Municipalities in Morelos are administratively autonomous of the state according to the 115th article of the 1917 Constitution of Mexico. Every three years, citizens elect a municipal president (Spanish: presidente municipal) by a plurality voting system who heads a concurrently elected municipal council (ayuntamiento) responsible for providing all the public services for their constituents. The municipal council consists of a variable number of trustees and councillors (regidores y síndicos). Municipalities are responsible for public services (such as water and sewerage), street lighting, public safety, traffic, and the maintenance of public parks, gardens and cemeteries. They may also assist the state and federal governments in education, emergency fire and medical services, environmental protection and maintenance of monuments and historical landmarks. Since 1984, they have had the power to collect property taxes and user fees, although more funds are obtained from the state and federal governments than from their own income.

The largest municipality by population is Cuernavaca, with 378,476 residents (19.19% of the state population), while the smallest is Tetecala with 7,617 residents. On November 9, 2017, the state legislature approved the creation of four indigenous municipalities (Coatetelco, Xoxocotla, Hueyapan and Tetelcingo), effective on January 1, 2019. However, due to objections by authorities in Cuautla, it was decided on July 26, 2018 that Tetelcingo would not be included in the list of new municipalities.

Municipalities

Notes

References

 
Morelos